Amauroderma aurantiacum is a polypore fungus in the family Ganodermataceae. It was first described as a species of Ganoderma by Portuguese botanist Camille Torrend in 1932. Tatiana Gibertoni and Annarosa Bernicchia transferred it to Amauroderma in 2008. A. aurantiacum is found in Brazil and Venezuela.

References

aurantiacum
Fungi described in 1932
Fungi of South America